Wang Wang and Fu Ni are the only giant pandas in the Southern Hemisphere. Born at the Wolong Giant Panda Research Centre in China, the pair relocated to Adelaide Zoo in Adelaide, South Australia on 29 November 2009. Wang Wang and Fu Ni were on loan for ten years for $1 million annually as part of a giant panda breeding program, but have not bred after more than five unsuccessful attempts by the zoo. Fu Ni has experienced many false pregnancies, which are difficult to distinguish from actual pregnancies. The loan has been described as an instance of "panda diplomacy" between Australia and China.

On 24 November 2019, the state government of South Australia signed a deal to extend the pandas' stay in Adelaide for five more years.

Etymology 
Fu Ni means "lucky girl" and Wang Wang means "net net". According to Chinese ambassador Zhang Junsai, the name reflects their hopes that "the lucky girl will fall into the net of love" and have a baby. Wang Wang was given his name whilst in China. In 2009, Mandarin speakers emailed an Adelaide television station arguing that the name was pronounced "wong wong"; this pronunciation is favoured by the Adelaide Chinese community.

Early life (2005–2009) 
Wang Wang was born on 31 October 2005 and Fu Ni was born on 23 August 2006 at the Wolong Giant Panda Research Centre in China. President Hu Jintao first offered them to Australia at the 2007 Asia-Pacific Economic Cooperation in Sydney. The 2008 Sichuan earthquake caused the destruction of the research centre and the death of Mao Mao, Wang Wang's mother, and the pandas were relocated to the Bifengxia Giant Panda Breeding Centre.

Arrival at Adelaide Zoo (2009–2010) 
Wang Wang and Fu Ni arrived at Adelaide Zoo in Adelaide, South Australia on 29 November 2009, escorted by police in a climate-controlled semitrailer. They first appeared on December 13 after Governor-General Quentin Bryce officially opened their enclosure. 175 families helped to plant bamboo for them. Initially on loan for ten years as part of a global giant panda breeding program, Wang Wang and Fu Ni are the only giant pandas in the Southern Hemisphere. A large amount of media attention was given to their arrival, and the loan has been described as an instance of "panda diplomacy" between Australia and China.

On 12 January 2010, the pair were released from their glass enclosures into their exhibit after a period of quarantine, ordered by minister Penny Wong. They also joined Earth Hour as "official ambassadors". 

Zoos SA borrowed $6.7 million to fund the pandas, while a lack of sponsors adding to the debt. The state government invested $18.9 million for the new entrance and fence, and the zoo paid $8 million dollars for the new exhibit from sponsors, donors and loans. After Wang Wang and Fu Ni's arrival, Adelaide Zoo's visitors grew 70% and membership to Zoos SA has grown 25%. However, after initial expectations that the pandas would contribute $600 million to the South Australian economy over a decade, visitor numbers returned to the same levels before their arrival by 2010.

Life at Adelaide and breeding attempts (2010–2024) 
In late 2011, they were introduced together for the first time after previously being separated by wire mesh.

When she begins her oestrus cycle, Fu Ni climbs her tree in the enclosure. She has experienced several pseudo pregnancies, which is difficult to distinguish from actual pregnancies as her blood tests, chemical signals and behavior all indicate she is pregnant. She underwent one in early 2017. Giant pandas have a short annual window to breed, often around 2472 hours.

In 2019, Prime Minister Scott Morrison criticized Labor's pledge to fund Wang Wang and Fu Ni for five more years, saying that Queensland floods should be more of a priority. On 24 November 2019, the Government of South Australia signed a new agreement with China to fund the pandas for five more years, after the initial ten-year deal had expired and the pandas were set to return to China. There have been five previous unsuccessful attempts to get the pair to mate. There have also been four or more attempts to artificially inseminate Fu Ni, including three procedures in 2017 and another planned in late 2022. Adelaide Zoo confirmed that Fu Ni had undergone either a "pseudopregnancy or a loss" in February 2023. Due to the pandas' continued failure to breed, it is possible the zoo might seek out a new pair of pandas after the new contract expires in November 2024.

Exhibit 
Wang Wang and Fu Ni's exhibit is called the Bamboo Forest. It is also home to two red pandas, Ravi and Mishry, and Manu, a blue and gold macaw. Dr. Phil Ainsley is the head of the team of panda handlers at Adelaide Zoo.

References

External links 
 

Zoo
Individual giant pandas
Adelaide Zoo